The Midnight is an American synthwave band composed of Atlanta-based singer-songwriter Tyler Lyle and Los Angeles-based Danish-born producer, songwriter, and singer Tim McEwan.

Origins
The band was formed as a result of Lyle and McEwan meeting during a co-writing workshop in 2012 in North Hollywood, CA. Inspired in part by the score for Drive, and the retro synth genre growing around its release, the pair wrote two singles, "WeMoveForward" and "Gloria", that would be released two years later in 2014 as part of their debut EP titled Days of Thunder.

Career
In 2016, the duo released a 12 track LP, Endless Summer, followed in 2017 with the release of Nocturnal, which spent several weeks as a best seller on the music distribution website Bandcamp and reached number 17 on Billboards Dance/Electronic charts in October 2017. The band went on to perform their second sell-out concert, taking place at the Globe Theatre on Broadway in Los Angeles in November 2017.
The band had multiple collaborations with Timecop1983, another retro synth genre producer. One of the collaborations appears on the album Nocturnal, titled "River of Darkness". The other collaboration between them appears on the album Night Drive of Timecop1983, titled "Static".

The band's motto is "", a Japanese phrase that loosely translates to "a sense of nostalgic wistfulness and the awareness that nothing lasts forever".

In 2019 McEwan appeared in the documentary film The Rise of the Synths, which explored the origins and growth of the synthwave genre. McEwan appeared alongside various other composers from the scene, including John Carpenter, who also starred in and narrated the film.

During the beginning of the COVID-19 pandemic lockdown, The Midnight hosted a remix competition called Remix Radio, providing the stems of multiple songs they had produced on their website for free. On April 3, 2020, the livestream premiered on YouTube for one hour and thirty minutes.

Personal lives
Tim McEwan's parents are Tom McEwan and Terese Damsholt

Discography

Studio albums

Collaborative albums

Extended plays

Singles

Remixes

References

Synthwave groups
Musical groups from Los Angeles
Musical groups established in 2014
Monstercat Silk artists
2014 establishments in the United States
Counter Records artists